NGC 6375 is a galaxy in the New General Catalog. It is located in the sky within the constellation Hercules. It is an E0 type lenticular, elliptical galaxy. It was discovered by German astronomer Albert Marth in 1864 with a mirror type telescope with a diameter of 121.92 cm (48 inches).

References

External links 
 SEDS

10875
6375
Hercules (constellation)
Elliptical galaxies